Snark may refer to:

Fictional creatures
 Snark (Lewis Carroll), a fictional animal species in Lewis Carroll's The Hunting of the Snark (1876)
 Zn'rx, a race of fictional aliens in Marvel Comics publications, commonly referred to as "Snarks"
 Corporal Snark, a minor character in Catch-22 (1961) by Joseph Heller 
 A species of creature in The 100 Lives of Black Jack Savage
 The Snark, fictional alien machine that visits Earth in the novel In the Ocean of Night (1977) by Gregory Benford
 A fictional creature from the TV series The Troop
 A fictional creature from the book series A Song of Ice and Fire, fictional even in the fictional world
 A beetle-like creature from Half-Life which doubles as a biological weapon.

Aircraft and missiles
 SM-62 Snark, an American intercontinental nuclear cruise missile
 Sopwith Snark, a British experimental fighter plane
 Barber Snark, a New Zealand kit-built tandem-seater light aircraft

Ships
 Snark, an experimental rescue submersible in the film Gray Lady Down (1978)
 The Snark, a yacht described in Jack Londons book The Cruise of the Snark (1911)
 Snark sailboat, a small, inexpensive, and lightweight sailboat
 MV The Second Snark, historically a shipyard tender, now in service as a cruise boat and ferry
 , a United States Navy patrol boat in commission from 1917 to 1919

Other
 Snark (graph theory), a type of graph
 SNARK (theorem prover), a computer program
 zk-SNARK, zero-knowledge Succinct Non-interactive ARgument of Knowledge, a cryptographic tool for producing short proofs of statements without revealing any additional information
 Snark, an Open Source BitTorrent client
 Snark (2009), a book by film critic David Denby
 Snark, a glider reflector in Conway's Game of Life
 Snark, a late 70s moped produced by F.I.V. Edoardo Bianchi
 Snark, snarky, or snarkiness, terms referring to sarcastic remarks

See also
Snork (disambiguation)
Snarf (disambiguation)